Thermus is a genus of bacteria.

Thermus may also be:

 a Roman cognomen, especially as used by
Quintus Minucius Thermus (consul 193 BC)
Marcus Minucius Thermus, a Roman praetor (81 BC) and general
 the Latinized spelling of the ancient city Thermos in Aetolia

See also 
 Thermos (disambiguation)